Percy Ellis Sutton (November 24, 1920 – December 26, 2009) was an American political and business leader. An activist in the Civil Rights Movement and lawyer, he was also a Freedom Rider and the legal representative for Malcolm X. He was the highest-ranking African-American elected official in New York City when he was Manhattan borough president from 1966 to 1977, the longest tenure at that position. He later became an entrepreneur whose investments included the New York Amsterdam News and the Apollo Theater in Harlem.

Early life, military service, education, and family
Sutton was born in San Antonio, Texas, the youngest of fifteen children born to Samuel Johnson ("S.J.") Sutton and his wife, Lillian.

His father, an early civil-rights activist, was one of the first black civil servants a teacher and school administrator in Bexar County, Texas, and used the initials "S.J." for fear his first name, Samuel, would be shortened to Sambo. In addition to being a full-time educator, S.J. farmed, sold real estate and owned a mattress factory, funeral home and skating rink.

Sutton's siblings included G. J. Sutton, who became the first black elected official in San Antonio, and Oliver Sutton, a judge on the New York Supreme Court.

At age twelve, Percy stowed away on a passenger train to New York City, where he slept under a sign on 155th Street in the Harlem neighborhood of the Manhattan borough of the city. Ironically, his oldest sister, Lillian Sutton Taylor who was 20 years his senior, was attending Columbia Teacher's College at the time.  His oldest brother John Sutton, a food scientist who had studied under George Washington Carver, and also in Russia, was living in New York at the time Percy arrived there.  His family clearly had resources, a sense of adventure and determination during a time when many African-Americans were extremely limited in options.

His family was committed to civil rights, and he bristled at racism. At age thirteen, while passing out leaflets in an all-white neighborhood for the National Association for the Advancement of Colored People (NAACP), he was beaten by a policeman. 

He joined the Boy Scouts of America and attained the rank of Eagle Scout in 1936 and was recognized with the Distinguished Eagle Scout Award as an adult. Sutton stated that scouting was a key factor in shaping his life. Percy and Leatrice Sutton married in 1943. He later took up stunt-flying on the barnstorming circuit, but gave it up after a friend crashed.

During World War II, he served as an intelligence officer with the Tuskegee Airmen – the popular name of a group of African American pilots who flew with distinction during World War II as the 332nd Fighter Group of the U.S. Army Air Forces. He won combat stars in the Italian and Mediterranean theaters.

Sutton attended  Prairie View A&M University in Prairie View, Texas; the Tuskegee Institute in Tuskegee, Alabama; and the Hampton Institute in Hampton, Virginia without receiving a degree. He went on to attend Columbia Law School and Brooklyn Law School, ultimately receiving his LL.B. from the latter institution in 1950. Shortly thereafter, he was admitted to the New York bar.

Legal career
During the 1950s and 1960s, Sutton became one of America's best-known lawyers. He represented many controversial figures, such as Malcolm X. After the murder of Malcolm X in 1965, Sutton and his brother Oliver helped to cover the expenses of his widow, Betty Shabazz.  Sutton's civil-rights advocacy took him even further in the minds of many.  Being jailed with Stokely Carmichael and other activists endeared him to the Harlem community and showed many that he was willing to place himself in harm's way for his client's sake.

Harlem leader
Sutton was a longtime leader in Harlem politics, and was a leader of the Harlem Clubhouse, also known as the "Gang of Four".  The Clubhouse has dominated Democratic politics in Harlem since the 1960s.  His allies in running the Clubhouse were New York City Mayor David Dinkins, U.S. Representative Charles Rangel, and New York Secretary of State Basil Paterson – whose son, David Paterson, became New York Governor in 2008. Sutton was the one who told David Paterson he should run for the State Senate. He also was a life member of the Kappa Alpha Psi fraternity.

Political career
He was a member of the New York State Assembly in 1965 and 1966. On September 13, 1966, he was elected Borough President of Manhattan, to fill the vacancy caused by the appointment of Constance Baker Motley to the federal bench. He served in that post until 1977, when he ran for the Democratic nomination for New York City Mayor against Bella Abzug, a former U.S. Representative; U.S. Representative Herman Badillo; incumbent New York City Mayor Abraham Beame; New York Secretary of State Mario Cuomo; and U.S. Representative Ed Koch; Koch won the nomination and the general election.

In his race for mayor, Sutton surprised his liberal political base when he turned temporarily to the right. He assailed the rising crime rate, as he termed the situation "a city turned sick with the fear of crime". He attacked criminals for "cheating, stealing, and driving away our families and our jobs." His candidacy was fatally injured by racial backlash that followed the looting and arson during the New York City blackout of 1977, directly precipitating his retrenchment from politics:"It was an especially cruel fate for ... Sutton, a master builder of color-blind alliances, who had long been tapped most likely to become New York's first black mayor. (New York magazine titled a May 1974 Sutton profile 'Guess Who's Coming to Gracie Mansion?'")

Private sector
In 1971, Sutton cofounded the Inner City Broadcasting Corporation which purchased New York City's WLIB-AM, the city's first African-American-owned radio station.

Sutton served in the New York City Police Department Auxiliary Police during the late 1970s.

Sutton produced It's Showtime at the Apollo, a syndicated, music television show first broadcast on September 12, 1987.

Awards and honors
In 1987, Sutton was awarded the Spingarn Medal, an award presented annually by the NAACP for outstanding achievement by an African American. In 1992 he received a Candace Award from the National Coalition of 100 Black Women.

See also

 Dogfights (TV series)
 Executive Order 9981
 Freeman Field Mutiny
 List of Tuskegee Airmen
 Military history of African Americans
 The Tuskegee Airmen (movie)
 Tuskegee Airmen
 Gang of Four (Harlem)
 David Paterson
 J. Raymond Jones

Further reading
John C. Walker,The Harlem Fox: J. Raymond Jones at Tammany 1920:1970, New York: State University New York Press, 1989.
David N. Dinkins, A Mayor's Life: Governing New York's Gorgeous Mosaic, PublicAffairs Books, 2013
Rangel, Charles B.; Wynter, Leon (2007)And I Haven't Had a Bad Day Since: From the Streets of Harlem to the Halls of Congress. New York: St. Martin's Press.
Paterson, David Black, Blind, & In Charge: A Story of Visionary Leadership and Overcoming Adversity. New York, New York, 2020

References

The African American Registry

External links

 Boyd, Herb. "'Mr. Chairman,' Percy Ellis Sutton, passes at 89," New York Amsterdam News, Sunday, December 27, 2009.
One of Texas Finest
Synematics, Inc
Percy Sutton's oral history video excerpts at The National Visionary Leadership Project

1920 births
2009 deaths
Politicians from San Antonio
African-American state legislators in New York (state)
Activists for African-American civil rights
American civil rights lawyers
Columbia Law School alumni
Brooklyn Law School alumni
Hampton University alumni
Manhattan borough presidents
Democratic Party members of the New York State Assembly
Military personnel from Texas
Prairie View A&M University alumni
Spingarn Medal winners
United States Army Air Forces officers
20th-century American politicians
Activists from Texas
David Paterson
New York Amsterdam News people